John McMullin may refer to:
 John McMullin (baseball)
 John McMullin (golfer)
 John McMullin (silversmith)

See also
 John McMullen (disambiguation)
 John McMullan, American football player
 John McMullan (cricketer)